Paul Schönwetter (born 15 November 1958) is a German former football player and manager who played as a midfielder.

References

1958 births
Living people
German footballers
Association football midfielders
Swiss Super League players
TSV 1860 Munich players
FC Locarno players
German football managers
FC Locarno managers
FC Baden managers
AC Bellinzona managers
FC Chiasso managers
FC Lugano managers
German expatriate footballers
German expatriate football managers
German expatriate sportspeople in Switzerland
Expatriate footballers in Switzerland
Expatriate football managers in Switzerland